Lieutenant-Colonel Sir Charles Bingham Lowther, 4th Baronet  (22 July 1880 – 22 January 1949), was the grandson of Sir Charles Lowther, 3rd Baronet, of Swillington and succeeded to his baronetcy in 1894.

Educated at Sandhurst, he was gazetted a second lieutenant in the 21st Lancers on 12 August 1899. Lowther served as an officer in the 8th King's Royal Irish Hussars, reaching the rank of captain before transferring into the Northamptonshire Yeomanry on 4 May 1911.

DSO 1917, was awarded the Croce di Guerra 17 May 1919, and made an Officer of the Order of the Crown of Italy on 2 March 1923.

Lowther was Master of the Pytchley Hounds from 1914 to 1927. He sold the Swillington estate in 1920 and after living at Thornby House, Northamptonshire for some years he settled at Erbistock Hall, Denbighshire. He was High Sheriff of Northamptonshire in 1926 and deputy lieutenant of Northamptonshire 29 July 1922. He retired from the Territorial Army as a lieutenant colonel on 3 August 1935.

On 19 June 1941, he was appointed an Officer of the Venerable Order of St John, and was made a Commander of the Order on 2 July 1947. Lowther was appointed a deputy lieutenant of Denbighshire in the same year, on 21 March 1947 and resigned his Northamptonshire commission on 3 April 1947. He was made a CB on 10 June 1948 and died early in the following year.

References

1880 births
1949 deaths
21st Lancers officers
8th King's Royal Irish Hussars officers
Baronets in the Baronetage of the United Kingdom
Northamptonshire Yeomanry officers
Commanders of the Order of St John
Companions of the Distinguished Service Order
Companions of the Order of the Bath
Deputy Lieutenants of Denbighshire
Deputy Lieutenants of Northamptonshire
British Army personnel of World War I
High Sheriffs of Northamptonshire
Charles